Arteche is a surname. Notable people with the surname include:

Alejandro Arteche (1923–1998), Spanish boxer
Héctor Martínez Arteche (1934–2011), Mexican painter and muralist
Juan Carlos Arteche (1957–2010), Spanish footballer
Miguel Arteche (1926–2012), Chilean poet and novelist